Susan Manning FRSE FRSA (24 December 1953 – 15 January 2013) was a Scottish academic specialising in Scottish studies and English literature. Before her death in 2013 at the age of 59, she was the Grierson Professor in English literature at the University of Edinburgh and the Director of the Institute for Advanced Studies in Humanities (IASH) at the University of Edinburgh. Prof. Manning's work on Scottish Enlightenment and transatlantic literature led to international acclaim. She was a Fellow of the Royal Society of Edinburgh and the Royal Society of Arts, Manufacturers and Commerce, Edinburgh.

Education 
Manning was born in Glasgow to Honora, a graduate of philosophy, and James Valentine, a physicist. When her family moved to Abingdon, Oxford in 1962 she attended Dunmore Primary where she met Jill Hanna. They became good friends and intellectual rivals, as Jill described in her tribute to Manning in 2013, "[W]e were rivals from the start, although the rivalry was simply a spur so that we both produced our individual best. Susan did not need a rival as she was always competing with herself". She later attended John Mason High School in Abingdon.

She earned a BA degree from Newnham College, University of Cambridge, graduating in 1976. It was at Cambridge that she met her future husband, physicist Howard Manning and got married.

She undertook doctoral studies at the University of Virginia under the supervision of Professor David Levin, a literary scholar and the Commonwealth Professor of English at the University of Virginia. She was equally attracted towards studying Scottish and American literature and the overlap between the two. Her main mode of inquiry involved discovering similarities between Scottish and American literary style, subjects and preoccupations, distinguishing these from English literature. This quest took the shape of defining what provincialism meant and its relation to any 'Centre'.

Professional contribution 

It took Manning 10 years to complete her PhD, during which time she was bringing up a young family. She  would often joke that it had taken three children Laura, Lindsay and Sophie to complete her PhD. She took up a research fellowship in the Newnham College in 1981 where she went on to become a lecturer in 1984.

Her interest in Scottish literature resulted in her first major publication, The Puritan-Provincial Vision: Scottish and American Literature in the Nineteenth Century, issued in 1990 by Cambridge University Press. In Cambridge, she created and taught the American literature course which became  popular among students.

References 

1953 births
2013 deaths
Academics of the University of Edinburgh
Alumni of Newnham College, Cambridge
Academics from Glasgow
University of Virginia alumni
Scottish women academics
Fellows of the Royal Society of Edinburgh
Fellows of the Royal Society
Scottish academics of English literature
Scottish studies